Badegau is a village in Sindhupalchok District in the Bagmati Zone of central Nepal. At the time of the 1991 Nepal census it had a population of 5,879 and had 1,130 houses.

References

Populated places in Sindhupalchowk District